Tara Suzanne Holm is a mathematician at Cornell University specializing in algebraic geometry and symplectic geometry.

Life and career
Holm graduated summa cum laude from Dartmouth College. Holm received her Ph.D. from the Massachusetts Institute of Technology in 2002 under the supervision of Victor Guillemin. She went on to a three-year postdoc at the University of California, Berkeley, before eventually joining the faculty at Cornell.

Awards and honors
In 2012, Holm became a fellow of the American Mathematical Society.

In 2013, Holm was awarded a Simons Fellowship.

In 2019, Holm was awarded the Sze/Hernandez Teaching prize at Cornell.

In 2019, Holm was the AWM/MAA Falconer Lecturer at MAA MathFest.

Selected publications

References

Living people
American women mathematicians
Cornell University faculty
20th-century American mathematicians
21st-century American mathematicians
Fellows of the American Mathematical Society
20th-century women mathematicians
21st-century women mathematicians
Year of birth missing (living people)
20th-century American women
21st-century American women